In enzymology, a 2-methyl-branched-chain-enoyl-CoA reductase is an enzyme that catalyzes the chemical reaction

2-methylbutanoyl-CoA + electron transfer flavoprotein  2-methylcrotonoyl-CoA + reduced electron transfer flavoprotein + H+

Thus, the two substrates of this enzyme are 2-methylbutanoyl-CoA and an electron transfer flavoprotein, whereas its 3 products are 2-methylcrotonoyl-CoA, reduced electron transfer flavoprotein, and H+.

This enzyme belongs to the family of oxidoreductases, specifically those acting on the CH-CH group of donors with flavin as acceptor.  The systematic name of this enzyme class is 2-methyl-branched-chain-acyl-CoA:electron-transfer flavoprotein 2-oxidoreductase . This enzyme participates in the degradation of isoleucine.  It employs one cofactor, FAD.

References

 
 

EC 1.3.8
Flavoproteins
Enzymes of unknown structure